Philogaeus is a genus of spiders in the family Thomisidae. It was first described in 1895 by Simon. , it contains 2 species, found in Brazil and Chile.

References

Thomisidae
Araneomorphae genera
Spiders of South America